Games & Puzzles was a magazine about games and puzzles. The magazine was first published in May 1972 by Edu-Games (UK) Ltd. The first editor was Graeme Levin who recruited a variety of games and puzzles experts as writers and consultant editors including Darryl Francis, David Parlett, David Pritchard, Don Turnbull, Eric Solomon, Gyles Brandreth, Nick Palmer, R. C. Bell, Richard Sharp, Sid Sackson and Tony Buzan. This gave it a good reputation; for example, Popular Computing wrote "Quite simply, Games & Puzzles Magazine is unique. There is no other publication quite like it anywhere in the world." Its headquarters was in London.

The magazine ceased publication in 1981 but was relaunched in 1994, and then stopped again in 1996. During its last period, between 1994 and 1996, the publisher was Games & Puzzles Publications.

References

1972 establishments in the United Kingdom
1996 disestablishments in the United Kingdom
Game magazines published in the United Kingdom
Defunct magazines published in the United Kingdom
Game magazines
Magazines published in London
Magazines established in 1972
Magazines disestablished in 1996